York Municipal Airport  is a mile northwest of York, in York County, Nebraska. The National Plan of Integrated Airport Systems for 2011–2015 categorized it as a general aviation facility.

Most U.S. airports use the same three-letter location identifier for the FAA and IATA, but this airport is JYR to the FAA and has no IATA code. (IATA assigned JYR to Jiroft Airport in Iran).

Facilities
It has two runways: 17/35 is 5,898 by 100 feet (1,798 x 30 m) concrete and 5/23 is 4,700 by 150 feet (1,433 x 46 m) turf.

In the year ending June 23, 2011 the airport had 10,500 aircraft operations, average 28 per day: 97% general aviation, 3% air taxi, and <1% military.
21 aircraft were then based at this airport, all single-engine.

References

External links 
 York Municipal Airport at City of York website
 York (JYR) at Nebraska Department of Aeronautics website
 Aerial image as of March 1999 from USGS The National Map
 

Airports in Nebraska
Buildings and structures in York County, Nebraska